Air Chief Marshal Vivek Ram Chaudhari,  is an air officer of the Indian Air Force. He currently serves as the Chief of the Air Staff (CAS). He took over as the 27th CAS succeeding Air Chief Marshal Rakesh Kumar Singh Bhadauria on 30 September 2021.  He earlier served as the  45th Vice Chief of the Air Staff and as the Air Officer Commanding-in-Chief Western Air Command.

Early life and education 
Chaudhari was born to Rambhau Ganapat Chaudhari. His mother was a school headmistress. His grandfather was a teacher at the Zila Parishad school at Koli, a village in Hadgaon taluka.  He studied in primary school at Nanded. The family moved to Hyderabad as his father started a company there. He thus did his schooling from BHEL Higher Secondary School, Ramachandrapuram, Hyderabad. He subsequently moved to Pune and enrolled in a military school. He is an alumnus of the National Defence Academy (61'st Course), the Air Force Academy and the Defence Services Staff College,  Wellington (DSSC).

Career

Chaudhari was commissioned in the Indian Air Force as a fighter pilot on 29 December 1982. He is a Category 'A' qualified flying instructor, and Instrument Rating Instructor and examiner. He has a flying experience of over 3800 hours on various fighter aircraft including MiG-21, MiG-23MF, MiG-29 and Su-30MKI. He was also a pioneer member of the Surya Kiran Aerobatic Display Team. As a fighter pilot, he flew operational missions during Operation Meghdoot and Operation Safed Sagar.

Chaudhari has commanded the MiG-29 squadron No. 28 Squadron IAF at Jamnagar and the forward base in Awantipora in Jammu and Kashmir. He also served as the chief operations officer of the Srinagar Air Force Station.

Flag officer
As an air commodore, he served as the Air assistant to the Chief of Air Staff, Air Chief Marshal Pradeep Vasant Naik. He subsequently commanded the Lohegaon air base in Pune. He has served as an instructor at DSSC Wellington as well as Defence Services Command and Staff College at Lusaka, Zambia.

After promotion to Air Vice Marshal, Chaudhari served as the Assistant Chief of Air Staff Operations (Air Defence) at Air headquarters and as the Deputy Commandant at the Air Force Academy, Dundigul. He subsequently was appointed the Assistant Chief of Air Staff (Personnel Officers) and later as Deputy Chief of Air Staff at Air HQ. On 1 October 2019, he was appointed Senior Air Staff Officer of the Eastern Air Command in Shillong. After a short stint, on 1 August 2020, he was appointed Air Officer Commanding-in-Chief Western Air Command.

Chief of Air Staff
On 21 September 2021, the Government of India appointed Chaudhari as the next Chief of the Air Staff after the retirement of Air Chief Marshal Rakesh Kumar Singh Bhadauria on 30 September 2021.

Honours and decorations 
During his career, Chaudhari has been awarded the Vayu Sena Medal in 2004, the Ati Vishisht Seva Medal in 2015 and the Param Vishisht Seva Medal in 2021 for his service.

Dates of rank

Personal life 
He is married to Neeta Chaudhari. They have two sons. His son is also in Indian Air Force, he is a Rafale fighter jet pilot.

References 

Living people
Chiefs of Air Staff (India)
Vice Chiefs of Air Staff (India)
Indian Air Force air marshals
National Defence Academy (India) alumni
Recipients of the Ati Vishisht Seva Medal
Marathi people
People from Nanded district
1962 births
Defence Services Staff College alumni